This is a list of shopping centres in Zambia with at least two anchor tenants such as supermarkets, hypermarkets, multicinemas, and department stores. Modern shopping centres are often called malls, even when they do not meet the definition of a mall (min.  by the smallest definition, for Canada) by the International Council of Shopping Centers.

References

Shopping centres
Zambia
Service industries in Zambia